The 2008 Wayne State Warriors football team represented Wayne State University in the 2008 NCAA Division II football season. The Warriors offense scored 222 points while the defense allowed 161 points.

Schedule

References

Wayne State
Wayne State Warriors football seasons
Wayne State Warriors football